Colombian singer Shakira, throughout her career, spanning three decades, has obtained a remarkable series of statistical achievements, setting and breaking several world records for a Latin artist with her participation in entrepreneurial activities, of acting and her performance in the musical scene for her videos, singles, albums, and tours.

Since its debut in the Latin market, it began surpassing several records already established by different artists, from the Latin sphere to later moving to the international sphere, among several of its achievements today are having "The best-selling female Latin album of all time" with Laundry Service that sold more than 13 million copies, as well as being The best-selling Latin female artist of all time, according to several media outlets, today's Latin artists seek to even equal the innumerable records that Shakira today has.

Global records and achievements for a Latin Artist

Records and achievements as a Latin artist in the continents

North America

USA, Canada and Mexico

Billboard Charts statistics 
When she reached number one with "Hips Don't Lie" in 2006 on the Billboard Hot 100, Shakira became the first South American artist to achieve number one on the Hot 100 in history. In addition, when she released her collaboration "Girl Like Me" in 2021, she became the second Latin artist with singles within the Billboard Hot 100 in 3 different decades only behind Gloria Estefan and the first South American to achieve it. It currently has the best performance on all Billboard charts around the world. To be the Latin with the most No. 1 in Latin Airplay and to be the South American with the best performance in the Top Latin Albums list and the second Latin only behind Selena. She is currently the second Latin female artist with the most No. 1s on the list with 11, only behind Gloria Estefan who has 15, although she is the Latin female artist with the most songs on this list.

South América 

Shakira to date has become the Latin woman with the largest number of songs and albums in Latin American territory. From her album "Pies Descalzos" to "El Dorado" positioning herself in the top 10 or in the first place in various markets such as Venezuela, Colombia, Brazil, Chile, Argentina and several more.

Europe, Asia and Africa

See also 

 List of best-selling female music artists
 List of best-selling albums of the 21st century

References 

Records
Shakira